is a Japanese actor, host, and model. He is best known  for his leading role as Yuiji Kira in the live action Closest Love To Heaven, and as Tenma Hase in the second season of Hana Yori Dango.

Career
Nakagawa originally started as a child actor but because of his sudden growth spurt he was given roles that were much older than his real age. He debuted in 2009 when he portrayed the young Ikki Sawamura in a drama re-enactment of TV documentary When I Was a Child which features Japanese actors and actresses in their childhood. He also appeared in  several dramas like Team Batista 2: General Rouge no Gaisen, Q10, Gō and Ohisama. Taishi then starred in the hit drama Kaseifu no Mita as one of the four children who struggles to cope with the loss of their mother.

Taishi was cast to play the bullied student Noboru Yoshikawa in the 2012 remake of Great Teacher Onizuka.  He also made regular appearances as an MC on TV Tokyo children's shows Oha Suta.

He is also a regular performer in The Comedy Of Life (LIFE!〜人生に捧げるコント〜) a comedy skit show that depicts the joys and sorrows of life which is presented in an omnibus format since 2018 but have been guesting on the show since 2017.

Filmography

Television dramas

Film

Music videos

Japanese dub

Photo books
 Chi Yubo / Kitchen (18.03.2014) by Naoki Kimura

Awards

References

External links

1998 births
Living people
21st-century Japanese male actors
Japanese male film actors
Japanese male child actors
Japanese male television actors
Stardust Promotion artists
Male actors from Tokyo